Kilbeg or Cuilbeg ( or ) is a common place name in Ireland:

Ireland
 Kilbeg, County Cavan
 Kilbeg, (townland), County Cork (1)
 Kilbeg, (townland), County Cork (2)
 Kilbeg, (townland), County Cork (3)
 Kilbeg, (townland), County Donegal
 Cuilbeg (townland), County Galway
 Kilbeg, (townland), County Galway (1)
 Kilbeg, (townland), County Galway (2)
 Kilbeg, (townland), County Galway (3)
 Kilbeg, (townland), County Galway (4)
 Kilbeg, (townland), County Galway (5)
 Kilbeg, (townland), County Kildare
 Kilbeg, (townland), County Laois
 Cuilbeg (townland), County Mayo
 Kilbeg, formerly Kilbeg (Malone), (townland), County Mayo
 Kilbeg (civil parish), County Meath
 Kilbeg, (townland), County Offaly
 Cuilbeg (townland), County Roscommon
 Kilbeg, (townland), County Roscommon
 Cuilbeg (townland), County Sligo
 Kilbeg, (townland), County Tipperary (1)
 Kilbeg, (townland), County Tipperary (2)
 Kilbeg, (townland), County Tipperary (3)
 Kilbeg, (townland), County Waterford (1)
 Kilbeg, (townland), County Waterford (2)
 Kilbeg, (townland), County Westmeath
 Kilbeg, (townland), County Wicklow

Scotland
 Sabhal Mòr Ostaig, Isle of Skye